Andreas Pihl (born February 25, 1973, in Uppsala, Sweden) is a Swedish retired professional ice hockey defenceman.

Playing career
Pihl began his career in 92/93, playing for Almtuna IS in his hometown of Uppsala. He stayed there for five seasons and then made a two-season-stint in Mora. Thereafter he made his debut in Elitserien with Modo Hockey.

After three years in Örnsköldsvik he joined the club Linköpings HC (LHC). He spent four seasons in LHC before leaving for play in Red Bull Salzburg EC in the Austrian Hockey League, however this lasted for only one, though highly successful, season. He decided to return to Linköping for the season of 07/08. On July 7, 2011, Pihl officially retired as a player.

External links
 
 Pihl retires (Swedish)

1973 births
Almtuna IS players
Linköping HC players
Living people
Modo Hockey players
Sportspeople from Uppsala
Swedish ice hockey defencemen
Swedish expatriate sportspeople in Austria